Entomobrya intermedia is a species of slender springtails in the family Entomobryidae.

References

Further reading

 

Collembola
Articles created by Qbugbot
Animals described in 1993